500 Place d'Armes is an International style building on the historic Place d'Armes square in Old Montreal quarter of Montreal, Quebec, Canada.

Completed in 1968 as the Banque Canadienne Nationale tower, it is Montreal's 17th tallest building, at 133 m (435 ft), 32 storeys.

It was designed by Montreal architects Pierre Boulva and Jacques David, whose other prominent Montreal projects included the Palais de justice de Montréal, Théâtre Maisonneuve, the Dow Planetarium and the Place-des-Arts, Atwater and Lucien-L'Allier metro stations.

When it was built in the late 60s, this building was the subject of heated talk. According to one source the building disfigured its part of Old Montreal, overshadowing all of the architecture of Old Montreal surrounding it.

See also
List of tallest buildings in Montreal

References

External links
 

Skyscrapers in Montreal
Old Montreal
Bank buildings in Canada
Office buildings completed in 1968
Skyscraper office buildings in Canada
International style architecture in Canada
National Bank of Canada